Metevbash (Mätäwbaş) is a rural locality (a selo) and the administrative centre of Metevbashevsky Selsoviet, Belebeyevsky District, Bashkortostan, Russia. The population was 789 as of 2010. There are 5 streets.

Geography 
Metevbash is located 26 km north of Belebey (the district's administrative centre) by road. Akkain is the nearest rural locality.

References 

Rural localities in Belebeyevsky District